Proposition 28 is a California ballot measure that was approved by California voters at the statewide election on June 5, 2012.  It was an initiative constitutional amendment to change California state legislature term limits from a limit of 8 years for the Senate and 6 years for the Assembly, to a limit of 12 years on combined service.  It affects only legislators first elected to the Assembly or Senate after the proposition passed.

Election results

See also
 2008 California Proposition 93, a failed proposition that proposed a similar change

References

2012 California ballot propositions
Initiatives in the United States